Bad Roads is a Russian-language Ukrainian drama film directed by Nataliia Vorozhbyt and released in 2020. Its world premiere took place on 3 September 2020 at the 35th Venice International Critics' Week, where it was screened in competition. In September 2021 it was selected as the Ukrainian entry for the Best International Feature Film at the 94th Academy Awards.

Plot
Four short stories are set along the roads of Donbass during the war. There are no safe spaces and no one can make sense of what is going on. Even as they are trapped in the chaos, some manage to wield authority over others. But in this world, where tomorrow may never come, not everyone is defenseless and miserable. Even the most innocent victims may have their turn at taking charge.

Cast
Film's top cast:
 Zoya Baranovska as young woman
 Maryna Klimova as journalist
 Anna Zhuravska as young girl
 Ihor Koltovskyy as school principal
 Andriy Lelyukh as commander

See also
 List of submissions to the 94th Academy Awards for Best International Feature Film
 List of Ukrainian submissions for the Academy Award for Best International Feature Film

References

External links
 

2020 films
2020 drama films
Ukrainian drama films
2020s Russian-language films
Russian-language Ukrainian films
War in Donbas films